Kokushikan University Football Club is a Japanese football club based in Tokyo. The club has played in Japan Football League.

External links
Official site
Football of Japan

Football clubs in Japan
1956 establishments in Japan